Felicia Nimue Ackerman (born 1947) is an American author, poet, and philosopher and professor of philosophy at Brown University. She is a prolific writer of letters to the editor of The New York Times.

Early life and education 
Ackerman, the daughter of Willis and Rachel Ackerman, was born in Ohio in 1947.

She received her A.B., summa cum laude, from Cornell University in 1968, and earned her Ph.D. from the University of Michigan, Ann Arbor, in 1976. Regarding her name, she writes, "Felicia Nimue is a double first name like Mary Jane, and I'm called the whole thing". She named herself, "after Nimue, the Lady of the Lake. She explains that she changed her name 'partly because I like her and partly because it was pretty,' and follows with, 'I named myself. After all, your parents have nothing to go on when they name you, because they don’t know you!'"

Selected publications 
Ackerman's research interests center on the philosophy of literature, bioethics, and moral psychology:

 Ackerman, Felicia Nimue, "Patient and Family Decisions about Life-Extension and Death", in 

According to Oxford Handbooks Online Scholarly Research Review, "her short stories on bioethical themes have appeared in Commentary, Mid‐American Review, Prize Stories 1990: The O. Henry Awards (Doubleday, 1990), and Clones and Clones: Facts and Fantasies About Human Cloning (Norton, 1998)."

She has published fifteen short stories, including:

 "Flourish Your Heart in This World", in M. Nussbaum and C. Sunstein (eds.), Clones and Clones: Facts and Fantasies about Human Cloning (Norton, 1998): 310–31, reprinted in American Philosophical Association Newsletter on Philosophy and Medicine, Spring 1999: 134–40. 
 "The Other Two Sides", in S. Hales (ed.), What Philosophy Can Tell You About Your Cat (Open Court, 2008): 89-100, reprinted in American Philosophical Association Newsletter on Philosophy and Medicine, Spring 2009: 18–21, and in Italian translation, Il Gatto e la Filosofia, ed. Steven D. Hales, trans. F. Verzotto (Colla Editore, 2011).

She writes a monthly op-ed column for The Providence Journal.

Ackerman is also a frequent letter writer to The New York Times, especially on subjects relating to the treatment of the elderly. Andrew Marantz of The Atlantic says letters editor Thomas Feyer named Ackerman the top contender as record holder for the most letters published, exceeding 200 letters since 1987. In a WNYC interview, Feyer also noted Ackerman writes as many as five letters to the editor per day.

Awards
From January to June 1985, she served as Senior Fulbright Lecturer in Philosophy at the Hebrew University of Jerusalem.of The Atlantic

In 1988–89, she served as a Fellow at the Center for Advanced Study in the Behavioral Sciences.

In 1990, her short story, "The Forecasting Game: a story" was published in the annual Prize Stories 1990 O. Henry Awards collection.

References

External links 

 , (video, 10:00 minutes)
 , (video, 10:00 minutes)
 , (video, 10:00 minutes)
 , (video, 10:00 minutes)
 ,(video, 10:00 minutes)

1947 births
Living people
Brown University faculty
Cornell University alumni
University of Michigan alumni
Philosophers from Rhode Island
American expatriates in Israel